In Greek mythology, the Amphillogiai  (singular: Amphillogia) were goddesses of disputes and altercations. Their Roman counterpart was Altercatio.

Family

Hesiod's account 
In Hesiod's Theogony identifies the Amphillogiai as daughters of Eris (Strife) through parthenogenesis and siblings of Hysminai ("Battles"), Makhai ("Wars"), Phonoi ("Murders") and Androktasiai (Manslaughters").

 "And hateful Eris bore painful Ponos ("Hardship"),
 Lethe ("Forgetfulness") and Limos ("Starvation") and the tearful Algea ("Pains"),
 Hysminai ("Battles"), Makhai ("Wars"), Phonoi ("Murders"), and Androktasiai ("Manslaughters");
 Neikea ("Quarrels"), Pseudea ("Lies"), Logoi ("Stories"), Amphillogiai ("Disputes")
 Dysnomia ("Anarchy") and Ate ("Ruin"), near one another,
 and Horkos ("Oath"), who most afflicts men on earth,
 Then willing swears a false oath."

Hyginus' account 
In another account, Amphillogiai/ Altercatio was the offspring of the primordial deities Aether and Gaia.

 "From Aether (Air) and Terra/ Gaia (Earth) [were born]: Dolor/ Algos (Pain), Dolus (Guile), Ira/ Lyssa (Anger), Luctus/ Penthus (Lamentation), Mendacium/ Pseudologoi (Lies), Jusjurandum/ Horcus (Oath), Ultio/ Poine (Vengeance), Intemperantia (Intemperance), Altercatio/ Amphillogiai (Altercation), Oblivio/ Lethe (Forgetfulness), Socordia/ Aergia (Sloth), Timor/ Phobos (Fear), Superbia (Arrogance), Incestum (Sacrilege), Pugna/ Hysminai (Combat)."

Notes

References 
 Gaius Julius Hyginus, Fabulae from The Myths of Hyginus translated and edited by Mary Grant. University of Kansas Publications in Humanistic Studies. Online version at the Topos Text Project.
 Hesiod, Theogony from The Homeric Hymns and Homerica with an English Translation by Hugh G. Evelyn-White, Cambridge, MA.,Harvard University Press; London, William Heinemann Ltd. 1914. Online version at the Perseus Digital Library. Greek text available from the same website.

Greek war deities
Greek goddesses
Personifications in Greek mythology
Children of Eris (mythology)